Oljatato may refer to:

 2201 Oljato, a minor planet
 Oljato Trading Post, a trading post located in Utah

See also 
 Oljato-Monument Valley (disambiguation)